Robert "Bobby" Marshall (born April 11, 1972) is a Canadian ice hockey coach and former defenseman who was an All-American for Miami.

Career
Marshall joined Miami in George Gwozdecky's second year behind the bench and arrived just in time for the then-Redskins to post their worst record, winning just 5 games in 1991. Despite the terrible year, Marshall acquitted himself well enough to get drafted by the Calgary Flames after the season.

Miami had a dramatic turnaround the following year, posting its first winning season in over a decade and winning the first playoff round in program history. Marshall's third season saw even better results, with Miami finishing atop the CCHA, reaching the conference championship and receiving a bid to the NCAA tournament all for the first time in team history. Marshall's point production nearly doubled throughout the season and he was named an All-American while leading the team with 43 assists. Marshall was named an alternate captain for his senior season and his scoring output decreased along with the team's record. Miami still finished with a winning record but the team was stopped in the conference quarterfinals. 

After graduating, Marshall began his professional career in Calgary's farm system. He played with the Saint John Flames for just over a season before he was traded to Anaheim for Jarrod Skalde. He spent the better part of two seasons with the Baltimore Bandits but was not resigned by the Mighty Ducks once his rookie contract ended. Marshall played the majority of the 1998 season in the CHL and then headed to Europe. At the end of the '99 season he returned to North America and helped the San Angelo Outlaws reach the President's Cup Final but was back in the DEL the following year. Marshall's playing career ended in 2002 after parts of two more seasons in lower-minor hockey and he transitioned into coaching.  In 2003, he was inducted into the Miami University Athletics Hall of Fame.

Marshall first job was as an assistant for the Brampton Battalion though it only lasted for one season. He continued to coach at the junior level for several years, including a stint as the head coach for the Don Mills Flyers, but was forced to halt his career after suffering a stroke in January 2020.

Statistics

Regular season and playoffs

Awards and honors

References

External links

1972 births
Living people
AHCA Division I men's ice hockey All-Americans
Baltimore Bandits players
Calgary Flames draft picks
Canadian ice hockey defencemen
Chicago Wolves players
Columbus Cottonmouths (CHL) players
Fort Wayne Komets players
Hershey Bears players
Miami RedHawks men's ice hockey players
Revier Löwen players
Saint John Flames players
San Angelo Outlaws players
Sportspeople from North York
Ice hockey people from Toronto